The jackfruit (Artocarpus heterophyllus), also known as the jack tree, is a species of tree in the fig, mulberry, and breadfruit family (Moraceae). Its origin is in the region between the Western Ghats of southern India.

The jackfruit tree is well-suited to tropical lowlands and is widely cultivated throughout tropical regions of the world, including India,Bangladesh, Sri Lanka, and the rainforests of the Philippines, Indonesia, Malaysia, and Australia. A mature jackfruit tree produces some 200 fruits per year, with older trees bearing up to 500 fruits in a year. The jackfruit is a multiple fruit composed of hundreds to thousands of individual flowers, and the fleshy petals of the unripe fruit are eaten. The ripe fruit is sweet (depending on variety) and is commonly used in desserts. Canned green jackfruit has a mild taste and meat-like texture that lends itself to being called "vegetable meat".

Jackfruit is commonly used in South and Southeast Asian cuisines. Both ripe and unripe fruits are consumed. It is available internationally, canned or frozen, and in chilled meals, as are various products derived from the fruit, such as noodles and chips.

Etymology and common name

The word jackfruit comes from Portuguese , which in turn is derived from the Malayalam language term , when the Portuguese arrived in India at Kozhikode (Calicut) on the Malabar Coast (Kerala) in 1499. Henry Yule translated the book in Jordanus Catalani's Mirabilia descripta: the wonders of the East. This term is in turn derived from the Proto-Dravidian root  ("fruit, vegetable").

The common English name "jackfruit" was used by physician and naturalist Garcia de Orta in his 1563 book . Centuries later, botanist Ralph Randles Stewart suggested it was named after William Jack (1795–1822), a Scottish botanist who worked for the East India Company in Bengal, Sumatra, and Malaya.

History
The jackfruit was domesticated independently in South Asia and Southeast Asia, as indicated by the Southeast Asian names which are not derived from the Sanskrit roots. It was probably first domesticated by Austronesians in Java or the Malay Peninsula. The fruit was later introduced to Guam via Filipino settlers when both were part of the Spanish Empire. It is the national fruit of Bangladesh and the state fruit of Kerala.

Botanical description

Shape, trunk and leaves 

Artocarpus heterophyllus grows as an evergreen tree that has a relatively short trunk and dense treetop. It sometimes forms buttress roots. The bark of the jackfruit tree is reddish-brown and smooth. In the event of injury to the bark, a milky sap is released.

The leaves are alternate and spirally arranged. They are gummy and thick and are divided into a petiole and a leaf blade.

In young trees, the leaf edges are irregularly lobed or split. On older trees, the leaves are rounded and dark green, with a smooth leaf margin. The leaf blade has a prominent main nerve and, starting on each side, six to eight lateral nerves.

Flowers and fruit 

The inflorescences are formed on the trunk, branches or twigs (cauliflory). Jackfruit trees are monoecious, having both female and male flowers on a tree. Inflorescences are initially completely enveloped in egg-shaped cover sheets which rapidly slough off.

The flowers are small, sitting on a fleshy rachis. The male flowers are greenish, some flowers are sterile. The male flowers are hairy and the perianth ends with two  membrane. The individual and prominent stamens are straight with yellow, roundish anthers. After the pollen distribution, the stamens become ash-gray and fall off after a few days. Later all the male inflorescences also fall off. The greenish female flowers, with hairy and tubular perianth, have a fleshy flower-like base. The female flowers contain an ovary with a broad, capitate, or rarely bilobed scar. The blooming time ranges from December until February or March.

The ellipsoidal to roundish fruit is a multiple fruit formed from the fusion of the ovaries of multiple flowers. The fruits grow on a long and thick stem on the trunk. They vary in size and ripen from an initially yellowish-greenish to yellow, and then at maturity to yellowish-brown. They possess a hard, gummy shell with small pimples surrounded with hard, hexagonal tubercles.

Radiating from this are many  individual fruits.

There may be about 100–500 seeds per fruit. The seed coat consists of a thin, waxy, parchment-like and easily removable testa (husk) and a brownish, membranous tegmen. The cotyledons are usually unequal in size, and the endosperm is minimally present. An average fruit consists of 27% edible seed coat, 15% edible seeds, 20% white pulp (undeveloped perianth, rags) and bark and 10% core.

The fruit matures during the rainy season from July to August. The bean-shaped achenes of the jackfruit are coated with a firm yellowish aril (seed coat, flesh), which has an intense sweet taste at maturity of the fruit. The pulp is enveloped by many narrow strands of fiber (undeveloped perianth), which run between the hard shell and the core of the fruit and are firmly attached to it. When pruned, the inner part (core) secretes a sticky, milky liquid, which can hardly be removed from the skin, even with soap and water. To clean the hands after "unwinding" the pulp an oil or other solvent is used. For example, street vendors in Tanzania, who sell the fruit in small segments, provide small bowls of kerosene for their customers to cleanse their sticky fingers. When fully ripe, jackfruit has a strong pleasant aroma, the pulp of the opened fruit resembles the odor of pineapple and banana.

Food

Ripe jackfruit is naturally sweet, with subtle pineapple- or banana-like flavor. It can be used to make a variety of dishes, including custards, cakes, or mixed with shaved ice as es teler in Indonesia or halo-halo in the Philippines. For the traditional breakfast dish in southern India, idlis, the fruit is used with rice as an ingredient and jackfruit leaves are used as a wrapping for steaming. Jackfruit dosas can be prepared by grinding jackfruit flesh along with the batter. Ripe jackfruit arils are sometimes seeded, fried, or freeze-dried and sold as jackfruit chips.

The seeds from ripe fruits are edible once cooked, and are said to have a milky, sweet taste often compared to Brazil nuts. They may be boiled, baked, or roasted. When roasted, the flavor of the seeds is comparable to chestnuts. Seeds are used as snacks (either by boiling or fire-roasting) or to make desserts. In Java, the seeds are commonly cooked and seasoned with salt as a snack. They are commonly used in curry in India in the form of a traditional lentil and vegetable mix curry. Young leaves are tender enough to be used as a vegetable.

Aroma

Jackfruit has a distinctive sweet and fruity aroma. In a study of flavour volatiles in five jackfruit cultivars, the main volatile compounds detected were ethyl isovalerate, propyl isovalerate, butyl isovalerate, isobutyl isovalerate, 3-methylbutyl acetate, 1-butanol, and 2-methylbutan-1-ol.

A fully ripe and unopened jackfruit is known to "emit a strong aroma" – perhaps unpleasant – with the inside of the fruit described as smelling of pineapple and banana.  After roasting, the seeds may be used as a commercial alternative to chocolate aroma.

Nutritional value

The edible pulp is 74% water, 23% carbohydrates, 2% protein, and 1% fat. The carbohydrate component is primarily sugars, and is a source of dietary fiber. In a  portion, raw jackfruit provides , and is a rich source (20% or more of the Daily Value, DV) of vitamin B6 (25% DV). It contains moderate levels (10-19% DV) of vitamin C and potassium, with no significant content of other micronutrients.

The jackfruit is a partial solution for food security in developing countries.

Culinary uses

The flavor of the ripe fruit is comparable to a combination of apple, pineapple, mango, and banana. Varieties are distinguished according to characteristics of the fruit flesh. In Indochina, the two varieties are the "hard" version (crunchier, drier, and less sweet, but fleshier), and the "soft" version (softer, moister, and much sweeter, with a darker gold-color flesh than the hard variety). Unripe jackfruit has a mild flavor and meat-like texture and is used in curry dishes with spices in many cuisines. The skin of unripe jackfruit must be peeled first, then the remaining jackfruit flesh is chopped into edible portions and cooked before serving. The final chunks resemble prepared artichoke hearts in their mild taste, color, and flowery qualities.

The cuisines of many Asian countries use cooked young jackfruit. In many cultures, jackfruit is boiled and used in curries as a staple food. The boiled young jackfruit is used in salads or as a vegetable in spicy curries and side dishes, and as fillings for cutlets and chops. It may be used by vegetarians as a substitute for meat such as pulled pork, though the protein content of the fruit is not significant. It may be cooked with coconut milk and eaten alone or with meat, shrimp or smoked pork. In southern India, unripe jackfruit slices are deep-fried to make chips.

South Asia
In Bangladesh, the fruit is consumed on its own. The unripe fruit is used in curry, and the seed is often dried and preserved to be later used in curry. In India, two varieties of jackfruit predominate: muttomvarikka and sindoor. Muttomvarikka has a slightly hard inner flesh when ripe, while the inner flesh of the ripe sindoor fruit is soft.

A sweet preparation called chakkavaratti (jackfruit jam) is made by seasoning pieces of muttomvarikka fruit flesh in jaggery, which can be preserved and used for many months. The fruits are either eaten alone or as a side to rice. The juice is extracted and either drunk straight or as a side. The juice is sometimes condensed and eaten as candies. The seeds are either boiled or roasted and eaten with salt and hot chilies. They are also used to make spicy side dishes with rice. Jackfruit may be ground and made into a paste, then spread over a mat and allowed to dry in the sun to create a natural chewy candy.

Southeast Asia
In Indonesia and Malaysia, jackfruit is called nangka. The ripe fruit is usually sold separately and consumed on its own, or sliced and mixed with shaved ice as a sweet concoction dessert such as es campur and es teler. The ripe fruit might be dried and fried as kripik nangka, or jackfruit cracker. The seeds are boiled and consumed with salt, as they contain edible starchy content; this is called beton. Young (unripe) jackfruit is made into curry called gulai nangka or stewed called gudeg.

The unripe fruit is usually cooked in coconut milk and eaten with rice; this is called ginataang langka. The ripe fruit is often an ingredient in local desserts such as halo-halo and the Filipino turon. The ripe fruit, besides also being eaten raw as it is, is also preserved by storing in syrup or by drying. The seeds are also boiled before being eaten.

Thailand is a major producer of jackfruit, which are often cut, prepared, and canned in a sugary syrup (or frozen in bags or boxes without syrup) and exported overseas, frequently to North America and Europe.

In Vietnam, jackfruit is used to make jackfruit chè, a sweet dessert soup, similar to the Chinese derivative bubur cha cha. The Vietnamese also use jackfruit purée as part of pastry fillings or as a topping on xôi ngọt (a sweet version of sticky rice portions).

Jackfruits are found primarily in the eastern part of Taiwan. The fresh fruit can be eaten directly or preserved as dried fruit, candied fruit, or jam. It is also stir-fried or stewed with other vegetables and meat.

Americas

In Brazil, three varieties are recognized: jaca-dura, or the "hard" variety, which has a firm flesh, and the largest fruits that can weigh between 15 and 40 kg each; jaca-mole, or the "soft" variety, which bears smaller fruits with a softer and sweeter flesh; and jaca-manteiga, or the "butter" variety, which bears sweet fruits whose flesh has a consistency intermediate between the "hard" and "soft" varieties.

Africa
From a tree planted for its shade in gardens, it became an ingredient for local recipes using different fruit segments. The seeds are boiled in water or roasted to remove toxic substances, and then roasted for a variety of desserts. The flesh of the unripe jackfruit is used to make a savory salty dish with smoked pork. The jackfruit arils are used to make jams or fruits in syrup, and can also be eaten raw.

Wood and manufacturing
The golden yellow timber with good grain is used for building furniture and house construction in India. It is termite-resistant and is superior to teak for building furniture. The wood of the jackfruit tree is important in Sri Lanka and is exported to Europe. Jackfruit wood is widely used in the manufacture of furniture, doors and windows, in roof construction, and fish sauce barrels.

The wood of the tree is used for the production of musical instruments. In Indonesia, hardwood from the trunk is carved out to form the barrels of drums used in the gamelan, and in the Philippines, its soft wood is made into the body of the kutiyapi, a type of boat lute. It is also used to make the body of the Indian string instrument veena and the drums mridangam, thimila, and kanjira.

Cultural significance
The jackfruit has played a significant role in Indian agriculture for centuries. Archaeological findings in India have revealed that jackfruit was cultivated in India 3000 to 6000 years ago. It has also been widely cultivated in Southeast Asia.

The ornate wooden plank called avani palaka, made of the wood of the jackfruit tree, is used as the priest's seat during Hindu ceremonies in Kerala. In Vietnam, jackfruit wood is prized for the making of Buddhist statues in temples  The heartwood is used by Buddhist forest monastics in Southeast Asia as a dye, giving the robes of the monks in those traditions their distinctive light-brown color.

Jackfruit is the national fruit of Bangladesh, and the state fruit of the Indian states of Kerala (which hosts jackfruit festivals) and Tamil Nadu.

Cultivation
In terms of taking care of the plant, minimal pruning is required; cutting off dead branches from the interior of the tree is only sometimes needed. In addition, twigs bearing fruit must be twisted or cut down to the trunk to induce growth for the next season. Branches should be pruned every three to four years to maintain productivity.

Some trees carry too many mediocre fruits and these are usually removed to allow the others to develop better to maturity.

Stingless bees such as Tetragonula iridipennis are jackfruit pollinators, and so play an important role in jackfruit cultivation. It seems to be the case that pollination results from a three-way mutualism involving the flower, a fungus, and a species of gall midge, Clinidiplosis ultracrepidata. The fungus forms a film over the syncarps which is a food source to both the fly larvae and adults.

Production and marketing
In 2017, India produced 1.4 million tonnes of jackfruit, followed by Bangladesh, Thailand, and Indonesia.

The marketing of jackfruit involves three groups: producers, traders, and middlemen, including wholesalers and retailers. The marketing channels are rather complex. Large farms sell immature fruit to wholesalers, which helps cash flow and reduces risk, whereas medium-sized farms sell the fruit directly to local markets or retailers.

Commercial availability
Outside countries of origin, fresh jackfruit can be found at food markets throughout Southeast Asia.  It is also extensively cultivated in the Brazilian coastal region, where it is sold in local markets. It is available canned in sugary syrup, or frozen, already prepared and cut. Jackfruit industries are established in Sri Lanka and Vietnam, where the fruit is processed into products such as flour, noodles, papad, and ice cream. It is also canned and sold as a vegetable for export.

Jackfruit is also widely available year-round, both canned and dried.  Dried jackfruit chips are produced by various manufacturers. As reported in 2019, jackfruit became more widely available in US grocery stores, cleaned and ready to cook, as well as in premade dishes or prepared ingredients. It is on restaurant menus in preparations such as taco fillings and vegan versions of pulled pork dishes.

Invasive species
In Brazil, the jackfruit can become an invasive species as in Brazil's Tijuca Forest National Park in Rio de Janeiro or at the Horto Florestal in neighbouring Niterói. The Tijuca is mostly an artificial secondary forest, whose planting began during the mid-nineteenth century; jackfruit trees have been a part of the park's flora since it was founded.

The species has expanded excessively because its fruits, which naturally fall to the ground and open, are eagerly eaten by small mammals, such as the common marmoset and coati. The seeds are then dispersed by these animals, spreading jackfruit trees that compete for space with native tree species. The supply of jackfruit has allowed the marmoset and coati populations to expand. Since both prey opportunistically on bird eggs and nestlings, the increases in marmoset and coati populations are detrimental to local birds.

See also 
 Domesticated plants and animals of Austronesia
 Chempedak, a closely related Southeast Asian fruit sometimes confused with jackfruit
 Durian, a fruit similar in appearance but from an unrelated tree, also from Southeast Asia

References

External links 
 
 
 
 

Artocarpus
Belizean cuisine
Crops originating from India
Flora of India (region)
Flora of Sri Lanka
Fruits originating in Asia
Meat substitutes
National symbols of Bangladesh
Non-timber forest products
South Asian cuisine
Southeast Asian cuisine
Tropical agriculture
Tropical fruit